The island of Taiwan has the largest number and density of high mountains in the world. This article summarizes the list of mountains that is under the Republic of China's territorial jurisdiction. 

Mountaineering is one of the most popular activities for many Taiwanese. A list of 100 Peaks of Taiwan was created in 1971, which lists the selected one hundred mountain peaks over 3,000 m for mountaineering on the island. Climbing all of the one hundred mountain peaks listed is considered a great challenge for Taiwanese climbers.

Mountain ranges
There are five mountain ranges in the main island of Taiwan

List of high mountains

Over 3,000 m

Notes:
The rank and locations is the one of the highest peak of each mountain.
In total, there are 165 mountains over 3,000 m above sea level, with a total of 275 peaks.
Of these 165 mountains, 116 (70%) are located in the Central Mountain Range, 41 (25%) in the Xueshan Range and 8 (5%) in the Yushan Range.
Both the Alishan Range and the Hai'an Range (With Data Mountain and Xingang Mountain as the highest mountains respectively) don't feature peaks exceeding 3,000 m above sea level, therefore they are not listed.

Over 2,900 m

Note:
The " – " means the mountain was already listed in the last list above.

Other mountains
Data Mountain 大塔山: , the highest mountain of Alishan Range, in Alishan, Chiayi.
Taiping Mountain 太平山: , a famous mountain in Datong, Yilan.
Xingang Mountain 新港山: , the highest mountain of Hai'an Range, in Fuli, Hualien.

Volcanoes

Over 1,000 m

Mountain areas
Alishan National Scenic Area: a famous mountain area in Alishan, Chiayi and nearby townships.
Yangmingshan National Park: a famous mountain and volcano area in Beitou and Shilin, Taipei City and nearby districts of New Taipei City.

Volcano areas (groups)
Datun Volcano Area (Tatun Volcano Area): a volcano area in Yangmingshan National Park, Beitou and Shilin, Taipei City and nearby districts of New Taipei City.
Keelung Volcano Area (Chilung or Jilong Volcano Area): a volcano area in Ruifang and Shuangxi, New Taipei City, near Keelung City.
Penghu Volcano Area 澎湖火山區: a volcano area in Penghu.

Notes

See also

List of volcanoes in Taiwan
List of islands by highest point
Geography of Taiwan
World record
List of Taiwanese superlatives
Taiwan

References

List of mountains over 3,000 m in Taiwan
Republic of China Alpine Association – List of high mountains of Taiwan (中華民國山岳協會 – 台灣高山明細表)
Kaohsiung Peak Mountaineering Association – List of mountains over 3,000 m in Taiwan (高雄市百岳登山協會 – 台灣3,000公尺以上高山名列表)
National Taiwan University Mountain Climbing Club – Mountains above 3,000 meters in Taiwan (台大登山社 – 台灣3,000公尺高峰一覽表)
Zengbinghuan – List of high mountains of Taiwan (曾炳煥 – 台灣高山列表)

External links
 Republic of China Alpine Association – List of One Hundred Mountains of Taiwan by height (中華民國山岳協會 – 台灣百岳高度順序表)
 Kaohsiung Peak Mountaineering Association – List of One Hundred Mountains of Taiwan (高雄市百岳登山協會 – 台灣百岳名列表)
 Hwaien – List of One Hundred Mountains of Taiwan (懷恩 – 台灣百岳列表)
 Logic Metrics Com. – Map of One Hundred Mountains and Ranking (拉駒克科技公司 – 台灣百岳地圖與列表)

 
Taiwan
Mountains
Taiwan
Mountains